Grasbroek is a neighbourhood and former mining colony in the municipality Heerlen, Netherlands. The neighbourhood was built to serve the mine Oranje-Nassau I.

Grasbroek houses the Patronaatsgebouw (Jos Wielders (1883–1949)), build in 1920 it is one of the earliest examples of Amsterdam School outside Amsterdam. Besides being in a state of disrepair all almost all original elements remain. Currently it is being restored, restoringcost around 3,500,000 euros

References

Heerlen
Mining communities in the Netherlands